Clitheroe is an English surname derived from the town of Clitheroe in Lancashire, England.

Notable people
Notable people with this surname include:
 Eleanor Clitheroe (born 1954), Canadian Anglican priest
 Helen Clitheroe (born 1974), British runner
 Jimmy Clitheroe (1921–1973), English comic
 Paul Clitheroe (born 1955), Australian television presenter
 Richard Clitheroe, multiple people
 Roger Clitheroe (born 1966), English cricketer

See also
 Baron Clitheroe

English toponymic surnames
English-language surnames